Been Arbel (20 January 1939 – 9 April 2013) was an Israeli mathematician and historian of mathematics who worked as Professor of Mathematics at Tel Aviv University.

Biography
Born in Romania, Arbel began his academic studies at the University of Bucharest, which he continued at the Hebrew University of Jerusalem upon immigrating to Israel in 1961. He completed his baccalaureate in mathematics and physics there in 1963, and his master's degree in mathematics in April 1965 (under the supervision of Aryeh Dvoretzky), a month after which he enlisted in the Israel Defense Forces.

From the late 1980s, Arbel served as director of the program for gifted young students in mathematics and computer science at Tel Aviv University.

Selected works

References

External links
 In memory of Prof. Beno Arbel

1939 births
2013 deaths
Einstein Institute of Mathematics alumni
Historians of mathematics
Israeli Jews
Israeli people of Romanian-Jewish descent
Israeli mathematicians
Mathematics educators
Romanian emigrants to Israel
Academic staff of Tel Aviv University
University of Bucharest alumni